Zarichne is a name of several localities in Ukraine:

 Zarichne, Rivne Oblast, a town in Rivne Oblast
 Zarichne, Donetsk Oblast, a town in Donetsk Oblast until 2016 also known as Kirovsk
 Zarichne Raion, Rivne oblast